Petra Mathers (born 1945) is a German-born American writer and illustrator of children's picture books.

Life and work
Petra Mathers was born in the Black Forest in Germany at the end of the second World War.  Instead of University, she opted for a three year apprenticeship in the book business.  "Wanting to see the world", she and her husband came to the United States and settled in Portland, Oregon.  Working first as a waitress, then in a children's bookstore, she started painting by making pictures for her son's room.  In time she showed in galleries in Oregon and Washington.  In 1983, she got her first job illustrating a children's book for Harper & Row, and in 1985 she wrote and illustrated the first book of her own.  She has illustrated over 40 books, 12 of which she also wrote.  She lives in Astoria, Oregon.

Style
Mathers is a self-taught artist and has a very distinct artistic style. Critic H. Nichols B. Clark describes her formal aesthetic, explaining that Mathers "[creates] simplified forms that comprise flat shapes. She assembles a carefully articulated formal arrangement whose visual dynamics are as integral to the production as the pictorial narrative." Linnea Hendricks explains that Mathers' picturebooks "combine a flat, naive, folklike style with wit and a strong sense of design" and are "praised for their freshness, originality, subtlety, and genuine feeling."

Awards and honors
Petra Mathers' work has earned much acclaim, including the following accolades:

1985—Ezra Jack Keats Award  for Maria Theresa
1986—New York Times Best Illustrated Children's Book of the Year for Molly's New Washing Machine (by Laura Geringer).
1988—New York Times Best Illustrated Children's Book of the Year for Theodor and Mr. Balbini.
1990—New York Times Best Illustrated Children's Book of the Year for I'm Flying (by Alan Wade).
1991—Boston Globe-Horn Book Award for Sophie and Lou.
1995—Society of Illustrators Silver Medal: for Kisses from Rosa.
1999—New York Times Best Illustrated Children's Book of the Year for Lottie's New Friend.
1999—Boston Globe-Horn Book Honor Award for Illustration for Lottie's New Friend.
1999—Society of Illustrators Silver Medal for Lottie's New Friend.

References

External links

 Children's Literature Independent Information and Reviews
 

1945 births
American women illustrators
American children's writers
Living people
People from Waldshut-Tiengen
German emigrants to the United States
20th-century American writers
21st-century American writers
American children's book illustrators
21st-century American women writers
20th-century American women writers